is a video game for the Super Famicom game console starring Mickey Mouse. It was published by Tomy on December 16, 1994 in Japan. This game has 6 levels.

Gameplay 
The player controls Mickey and his balloon backpack machine that can use water or gas balloons to Mickey's advantage. Water and gas balloons deals the same damage to enemies, but they work in different aspects. Water balloons can be used in different ways, such as crossing ice or air obstacles and breaking bricks/blocks that hold treasure. They can also be tossed against enemies. Gas balloons are the more useful weapon in the game and can be used to get across pits or travel faster when underwater. The earlier the player lets go of the gas from the point that the gas meter is completely filled, the more boost they will get. However, gas balloons can only be fired upwards.

There are treasure chests scattered around the six worlds for players to find. The invincibility novelty Mickey cap that will make the player invincible for a limited amount of time. Two forms of Mickey currency, Mickey pouch and Mickey Tokens, add coins to the player's inventory and over time earns them an extra try. The Red mickey novelty toy adds 1-4 balloons to the life bar. The Mickey tour guide earns the player one extra try.

Plot 
Mickey is preparing to practice dance show routines with his friends to entertain the guests of Tokyo Disneyland. But when he arrives, he finds out from Minnie that his friends have been tricked by none other than Pete to believe that today was an off-day, and therefore went to enjoy themselves on the attractions of the park. Armed with nothing but a combo water/helium backpack and some balloons, Mickey must trek through the different sections of the park and some of its most iconic attractions to gather his friends and stop Pete.

Release 
It was released on December 16, 1994 for the Super Famicom.

See also
Adventures in the Magic Kingdom
Walt Disney World Quest: Magical Racing Tour
Kinect: Disneyland Adventures
List of Disney video games

References

External links 
Super Famicom page

1994 video games
Platform games
Super Nintendo Entertainment System games
Super Nintendo Entertainment System-only games
Tomy games
Video games set in Tokyo
Japan-exclusive video games
Mickey Mouse video games
The Haunted Mansion video games
Video games based on Walt Disney Parks and Resorts attractions
Video games developed in Japan
Video games set in amusement parks
Single-player video games